Asher ben Jehiel (or Asher ben Yechiel, sometimes Asheri) (1250 or 1259 – 1327) was an eminent rabbi and Talmudist best known for his abstract of Talmudic law. He is often referred to as Rabbenu Asher, “our Rabbi Asher” or by the Hebrew acronym for this title, the Rosh. His yahrzeit is on 9 Cheshvan.

Biography
The Rosh was probably born in Cologne, Holy Roman Empire, and died in Toledo. His family was prominent for learning and piety, his father Yechiel was a Talmudist, and one of his ancestors was Rabbi Eliezer ben Nathan (the RaABaN). Asher had eight sons, the most prominent of whom were Jacob (author of the Arba'ah Turim) and Judah.

In 1286, King Rudolf I had instituted a new persecution of the Jews, and the great teacher of the Rosh, Rabbi Meir of Rothenburg, left Germany but was captured and imprisoned. The Rosh raised a ransom for his release, but Rabbi Meir refused it, for fear of encouraging the imprisonment of other rabbis. Thereafter the Rosh assumed Rabbi Meir's position in Worms. He was, however, forced to emigrate (in all likelihood, a victim of blackmail by the government, aimed at acquiring his fortune). After leaving Germany, he first settled in southern France, and then in Toledo, Spain, where he became rabbi on the recommendation of Rabbi Solomon ben Abraham Aderet (RaShBA). Rabbenu Asher's son Judah testified to the fact that he died in poverty. Rabbeinu Asher died in Toledo on 9 Cheshvan 5088 (1327 CE). His known surviving children were said to have been killed in the ensuing persecutions that affected Spain in 1392.

Rabbenu Asher possessed "methodical and systematic" Talmudic knowledge, and was distinguished for his ability to analyze and thereby clarify long Talmudic discussions. The Rosh was known for his independent legal reasoning: "We must not be guided in our decisions by the admiration of great men, and in the event of a law not being clearly stated in the Talmud, we are not bound to accept it, even if it be based on the works of the Geonim."  (For instance, the Rosh ruled that the liturgy of the Geonim was not subject to the Talmudic rule against change in the prayers.)

Rabbenu Asher was opposed to the study of secular knowledge, especially philosophy. He held that philosophy is based on critical research, whereas religion is based on tradition and the two are thus "incapable of harmonization". He said that "none that go unto her may return"—in fact, he thanked God for having saved him from its influence, and boasted of possessing no knowledge outside the Torah. He attempted to issue a decree against the study of non-Jewish learning. One effect of this attitude was to limit his influence on secular Spanish Jewry. At the same time, within rabbinic circles, "he transplanted the strict and narrow Talmudic spirit from Germany to Spain", and this, in some measure, turned Spanish Jews from secular research to the study of the Talmud.

Works
Rabbenu Asher's best known work is his abstract of Talmudic law. This work specifies the final, practical halakha, leaving out the intermediate discussion and concisely stating the final decision. It omits areas of law limited to Eretz Yisrael (such as agricultural and sacrificial laws) as well as the aggadic portions of the Talmud. Asher's son Jacob compiled a list of the decisions found in the work, under the title Piskei Ha-Rosh (decisions of the Rosh). Commentaries on his Halachot were written by a number of later Talmudists. In yeshivot, this work is studied as a regular part of the daily Talmud study.

This work resembles the Hilchot of the Rif (Rabbi Isaac Alfasi)—also an adumbration—but differs in quoting later authorities: Maimonides, the Tosafists and Alfasi himself. One theory states that the work is actually not a commentary on the Talmud but is rather a commentary on the Rif, given that it always starts with the text of the Rif. Some however dispute this.

Rabbenu Asher's work has been printed with almost every edition of the Talmud since its publication. This work was so important in Jewish law that Yosef Karo included the Rosh together with Maimonides and Isaac Alfasi as one of the three major poskim (decisors) considered in determining the final ruling in his Shulchan Arukh.

Rabbi Asher also wrote:
Orchot Chaim, an essay on ethics, written for his sons. It begins with the comment, “Distance yourself from haughtiness, with the essence of distancing.” Orchot Chaim is today an important work of musar literature.
A commentary on Zeraim (the first order of the Mishnah)—with the exception of Tractate Berachot.
A commentary on Tohorot (the sixth order of the Mishnah).
The Tosefot ha-Rosh, Tosafot-like glosses on the Talmud.
A volume of responsa; see History of Responsa: Fourteenth century.
 There is a volume of responsa entitled 'Besamim Rosh' which is falsely attributed to the Rosh. In fact it has been shown to be a forgery from the 18th century, and contains controversial decisions which contradict what the Rosh wrote in his (genuine) responsa. This collection was published by Saul Berlin, Tzvi Hirsch Levin's son. It was exposed as a forgery by Mordecai Benet (amongst others)
A commentary on the Torah which often uses mystical interpretations such as using gematria and acronyms similar to his son Jacob ben Asher more famous work Rimzei Ba'al ha-Turim.

References

External links
Rabbi Asher ben Yechiel – The “Rosh”, ou.org
Orchot Chaim Hebrew Fulltext, daat.ac.il

1250s births
1327 deaths
13th-century German rabbis
13th-century Castilian rabbis
14th-century Castilian rabbis
Rabbis from Worms, Germany
Authors of books on Jewish law
Writers of Musar literature